Aluizio Courrage Lage (11 March 1919 – 18 June 1974) was an Olympic freestyle swimmer from Brazil, who participated at one Summer Olympics for his native country. At the 1936 Summer Olympics in Berlin, he swam the 400-metre and the 4×200-metre freestyle, not reaching the finals.

References

External links 
 

1919 births
1974 deaths
Brazilian male freestyle swimmers
Olympic swimmers of Brazil
Swimmers at the 1936 Summer Olympics
Sportspeople from Rio de Janeiro (city)
20th-century Brazilian people